"The Comfort Zone" is a song by American singer and actress Vanessa Williams, released in October 1991 as the second single from her second studio album of the same name (1991). The song peaked at number two on the US Billboard Hot R&B/Hip-Hop Songs chart (behind Shanice's "I Love Your Smile") and was nominated for the 1993 Grammy Award for Best Female R&B Vocal Performance.

In interviews, Williams has stated that she had wanted this to be the lead single from her album but her record company chose "Running Back to You" since it was summer and they wanted an energetic song.

Critical reception
Mike Joyce from The Washington Post described the song as "punchy", viewing it as one of the "more likely candidates for radio exposure".

Track listing
 US 12" single
A1. "The Comfort Zone" (Vanessa's Vibe Mix) (7:33)
A2. "The Comfort Zone" (Comfortable Percapella It's a Late Nite Thing!) (5:29)
B1. "The Comfort Zone" (Frankie's Comfortable Mix) (6:35)
B2. "The Comfort Zone" (Frankie's Comfortable Dub) (6:46)

Charts

Weekly charts

Year-end charts

References

1991 singles
Vanessa Williams songs
Songs written by Kipper Jones
1991 songs
Wing Records singles